The 2018–19 network television schedule for the five major English commercial broadcast networks in Canada covers primetime hours from September 2018 through August 2019. The schedule is followed by a list per network of returning series, new series, and series canceled after the 2017-18 television season, for Canadian, American and other series.

CBC Television was first to announce its fall schedule on May 24, 2018, followed by Global on June 4, Citytv on June 5, and CTV and CTV 2 on June 7, 2018. As in the past, the commercial networks' announcements come shortly after the networks have had a chance to buy Canadian rights to new American series. CTV 2 and Global are not included on Saturday as they normally only schedule encore programming in primetime on Saturdays.

Legend 
 Light blue indicates Local Programming.
 Grey indicates Encore Programming.
 Light green indicates sporting events.
 Red indicates Canadian content shows, which is programming that originated in Canada.
 Magenta indicates series being burned off and other irregularly scheduled programs, including specials.
 Cyan indicates various programming.
 Light yellow indicates the current schedule.

Schedule 
 New series are highlighted in bold. Series that have changed network are not highlighted as new series.
 All times given are in Canadian Eastern Time and Pacific Time (except for some live events or specials, including most sports, which are given in Eastern Time).

Sunday

Monday

Tuesday

Wednesday

Thursday

Friday

Saturday

By network

CBC Television 

Returning series:
22 Minutes
Anne
Back in Time for Winter
Baroness von Sketch Show
Battle of the Blades
Burden of Truth
Catastrophe
The Detectives
Diggstown
Dragons' Den
The Fifth Estate
Fortunate Son
Frankie Drake Mysteries
The Great Canadian Baking Show
Heartland
High Arctic Haulers
Hockey Night in Canada (shared with Citytv)
Little Dog
Kim's Convenience
Marketplace
Murdoch Mysteries
The National
The Nature of Things
Schitt's Creek
Still Standing
Vanity Fair
Workin' Moms

New series:
Canada's Smartest Person Junior
Coroner
Cavendish
In the Making
Unspeakable

Not returning from 2017-18:
Caught
Unspeakable
Rick Mercer Report
Versailles

Citytv 

Returning series:
America's Got Talent
Bad Blood
The Bachelor
The Bachelorette
Black-ish
Bob's Burgers
Brooklyn Nine-Nine
Dancing with the Stars
Family Guy
The Gifted (moved from CTV)
Hell's Kitchen
Hockey Night in Canada (shared with CBC)
Lethal Weapon
Life in Pieces
Modern Family
Mom
Murphy Brown
The Orville
The Simpsons (moved from Global)

New series:
The Bletchley Circle: San Francisco
The Cool Kids
Catch-22
Hudson & Rex
Manifest
A Million Little Things
Paradise Hotel
Rel
Single Parents
Songland
The Twilight Zone

Not returning from 2017-18:
The Blacklist (moved to Global)
Fubar: The Age of the Computer
Ghosted
LA to Vegas
The Last Man on Earth
Little Big Shots (returned for 2019-20)
The Mick
The Middle
The Mindy Project
New Girl
Nirvanna the Band the Show
The Resident (moved to CTV)
Scorpion
Speechless

CTV/CTV 2 

Returning series:
Agents of S.H.I.E.L.D.
The Amazing Race Canada
The Amazing Race USA
American Housewife
American Idol
American Ninja Warrior
The Big Bang Theory
Blue Bloods
Blindspot
Cardinal
Criminal Minds
Ellen's Game of Games
etalk
Football Night in America
For the People
The Goldbergs
Gotham
The Good Doctor
Grey's Anatomy
How to Get Away with Murder
The Launch
Law & Order: Special Victims Unit
MasterChef Canada
MasterChef Junior
NBC Sunday Night Football
NFL GameDay
NFL on Fox
The Resident (moved from Citytv)
Station 19
Shark Tank
SportsCentre
The Voice
This Is Us
Thursday Night Football
W5
World of Dance
Young Sheldon

New series:
America's Got Talent: The Champions
The Alec Baldwin Show
The Conners
The Enemy Within
The Fix
God Friended Me
Jann
The Kids Are Alright
Magnum P.I
The Rookie
The Village
Whiskey Cavalier

Not returning from 2017-18:
Alex, Inc
Arrow (moved to CTV Sci-Fi Channel)
Code Black
The Crossing
The Detail
Designated Survivor (moved to Netflix)
The Disappearance
The Exorcist
The Flash (moved to Netflix)
The Gifted (moved to Citytv)
The Indian Detective
Inhumans
Kevin (Probably) Saves the World
Legends of Tomorrow (moved to CTV Sci-Fi Channel)
Living Biblically
Lucifer (moved to Netflix)
The Mayor
Once Upon a Time
Quantico
Roseanne

Global 

Returning series:
9-1-1
Big Brother USA
Big Brother Canada
The Blacklist (moved from Citytv)
Bull
Celebrity Big Brother
Chicago Fire
Chicago Med
Chicago P.D.
Elementary
Entertainment Tonight
Entertainment Tonight Canada
The Good Place
Hawaii Five-0
Instinct
MacGyver
Madam Secretary
Man with a Plan
NCIS
NCIS: Los Angeles
NCIS: New Orleans
Private Eyes
SEAL Team
Superstore
Survivor
S.W.A.T.
Will & Grace

New series:
BH90210
 Blood & Treasure
Dancing with the Stars: Juniors
FBI
I Feel Bad
Happy Together
Holey Moley
The InBetween
The Neighborhood
New Amsterdam
Schooled
The Titan Games

Not returning from 2017-18:
9JKL
The Brave
Great News
Kevin Can Wait
Law & Order: True Crime
Superior Donuts
The Simpsons (moved to Citytv)
Timeless
Wisdom of the Crowd

Cancellations/series endings

Global
Mary Kills People—Series Finale on June 16, 2019, after three seasons.

See also
 2018–19 United States network television schedule

References

 
 
Canadian television schedules